Thomas Patrick Campbell was a male athlete who competed for England.

Athletics career
He competed for England in the steeplechase at the 1934 British Empire Games in London.

References

English male steeplechase runners
Athletes (track and field) at the 1934 British Empire Games
Commonwealth Games competitors for England